State of Emergency is a 1994 American drama film directed by Lesli Linka Glatter and written by Susan Black and Lance Gentile. The film stars Joe Mantegna, Lynn Whitfield, Melinda Dillon, Paul Dooley, Jay O. Sanders and Richard Beymer. The film premiered on HBO on February 12, 1994.

Plot

Cast 
Joe Mantegna as Dr. John Novelli
Lynn Whitfield as Dehlia Johnson
Melinda Dillon as Betty Anderson
Paul Dooley as Jim Anderson
Jay O. Sanders as Dr. Jeffrey Forrest
Richard Beymer as Dr. Ronald Frames
Robert Beltran as Raoul Hernandez
Christopher Birt as Dr. Victor Davidson
Dean Cameron as Roger
Deborah Kara Unger as Sue Payton
Paul Ben-Victor as Trevor Jacobs
F. William Parker as Brent Avery
Lucy Butler as Rebecca Farinzi
Gerald Castillo as Ralph Ortiz
John Considine as Malcolm Parker
Irene Olga López as Maris Alvarez
Lance Gentile as Dr. Wayne Garrick
Quinn Harmon as Elaine Fitzgerald
Josie Kim as Joan Brooks
Vanessa Marquez as Violetta
Gregory Sporleder as Larry
Kate Williamson as Dr. Yvonne Chambers 
Blair Tefkin as M.I.C.N. Dispatcher

References

External links
 

1990s American films
1994 television films
1994 films
1994 drama films
1990s English-language films
American drama television films
Films directed by Lesli Linka Glatter
Films scored by Robert Folk
HBO Films films